Dr Antonio M. de Lacy Fortuny (born February 13, 1957 in Palma de Mallorca, Spain) is a Spanish doctor. He is Head of the Gastrointestinal Surgery Service and Chief of the Minimally Invasive Surgery Department at the Hospital Clínic, Barcelona (Spain).

Biography

Education 
 1980 MD in Medicine and Surgery. Medical School (Universitat de Barcelona)
 1987 Specialist in General Surgery (Hospital Clínic de Barcelona)
 1988 Ph.D. in Medicine and Surgery: “Distal Spleno-Renal Anastomosis through the Retroperitoneum. A Study of Long-Term Haemodynamic Alterations”. Excellent Cum Laude Distinction (Universitat de Barcelona)

Postgraduate Training 
 Emory University (Atlanta)
 Pacific Presbyterian Hospital (San Francisco)
 Cleveland Clinic (Cleveland)
 Mount Sinai Hospital (New York City)
 Cornell University (New York State)

Professional career 
 1983-1987 – Surgery Internist: 2nd University Surgery Clinic. Hospital Clínic i Provincial de Barcelona. 
 1988 – Surgery Associate:  Surgery Subdepartment. General and Digestive Surgery Service. Hospital Clínic i Provincial de Barcelona. 
 1996-2001 - Senior Specialist: General and Digestive Surgery Service. Institut de Malalties Digestives. Hospital Clínic i Provincial de Barcelona. 
 1998-2003 – Associate Professor of Surgery and Surgical Specialities: Surgery Department. Medical School, Universitat de Barcelona.
 2001 – Surgery Consultant: General and Digestive Surgery Service. Institut de Malalties Digestives. Hospital Clínic i Provincial de Barcelona. 
 2002 – Member of the Advisory Board to the Medical Management at the Hospital Clínic de Barcelona.
 2002 – Head of Department at the Gastrointestinal Surgery Department. Institut de Malalties Digestives I Metabòliques. Hospital Clínic de Barcelona.
 2003 – Professor of Surgery and Surgical Specialities. Surgery Department. Medical School, Universitat de Barcelona.
 2007 – Head of Service at the Gastrointestinal Surgery Service. Institut de Malalties Digestives i Metabòliques, Hospital Clínic de Barcelona.
 2007-2009 – President of EAES (European Association for Endoscopic Surgery).

Research 

 Laparoscopic surgery (gastroesophageal reflux disease, achalasia, oesophagus and stomach tumours, diverticular disease, inflammatory bowel disease – Crohn’s disease and ulcerative colitis –, colorectal cancer, colonic bowel polyposis, liver surgery, gall bladder and bile duct surgery, pancreas tumours, etc.) He has performed various new procedures: the first laparoscopic and thoracoscopy approach to oesophageal cancer, the first laparoscopic approach to live kidney donation, etc.
 NOTES (Natural Orifice Transluminal Endoscopic Surgery) and SILS (Single Incision Laparoscopic Surgery). He has performed transgastric cholecystectomy, anti-transoral oesophageal-gastric reflux techniques, transvaginal sigmoidectomy, transvaginal tubular gastroplasty, cholecystectomy and obesity surgery – sleeve gastrectomy, taking a SILS approach.
 Oncological Surgery (colon and rectal cancer, esophageal and stomach cancer, metastasis treatment – surgical resection, radiofrequency, etc. –, pancreas cancer, liver tumours).
 Obesity Surgery and Development of Surgical Programme for Type-2 Diabetes and Metabolic Syndrome, as part of international working groups for the development of new techniques.
 Dr Lacy is also a pioneer in use of the Cecil Approach (simultaneous robotic transabdominal and transanal approach to removal of rectal cancer).
 He is a Founding Member of AIS (Advances in Surgery) Channel, a leading global educational platform providing training and networking for surgeons.

Publications 
Dr Lacy has 175 publications under his name, with a global Impact Factor of 454 and a Hirsch index of 32.

References

Spanish surgeons
1957 births
Living people